Kinlyside is a rural locality in the Australian Capital Territory. It was gazetted in 1991 as a planned outer suburb of Gungahlin. It was never released for development, and the governing Labor Party campaigned at the 2004 election and 2008 election on the policy of making Kinlyside a nature reserve instead. In 2013, it was set aside as a protected area that would remain undeveloped under an environmental offsets plan associated with increased development in Gungahlin. As of 2019, it remains a gazetted locality in the Territory Plan.

According to the ACT's Planning and Land Authority, the locality is named after George Kendall Kinlyside.

Kinlyside is bounded by the village of Hall to the west, Nicholls to the south east, by Casey to the east and Clarrie Hermes Drive to the south. The suburb's other boundaries have been surveyed but not yet established.

Geology

Underneath Kinlyside are acid volcanic rocks from the middle Silurian period. These are from the Hawkins Volcanics. The hills in the west of the locality are mostly green grey dacite, and the valley bottom is mostly purple andesite covered in part by alluvium.

References